Mahsa Javar  (born 12 June 1994) is an Iranian competitive rower.

At the Olympic qualifying events in April 2016 she came second to Huang Yi-ting. Following her qualification for the Olympics, she was one of nine Iranian female athletes

She competed at the 2016 Summer Olympics in Rio de Janeiro, in the women's single sculls.

References

External links

1994 births
Living people
Iranian female rowers
Olympic rowers of Iran
Rowers at the 2016 Summer Olympics
People from Zanjan, Iran
Asian Games silver medalists for Iran
Asian Games bronze medalists for Iran
Asian Games medalists in rowing
Rowers at the 2014 Asian Games
Rowers at the 2018 Asian Games
Medalists at the 2014 Asian Games
Medalists at the 2018 Asian Games
20th-century Iranian women
21st-century Iranian women